The Women's Slalom competition in the 2016 FIS Alpine Skiing World Cup involved 11 events, including one parallel slalom (a city event, which only allows for 16 competitors) and the season finale in St. Moritz, Switzerland.

Three-time defending discipline champion Mikaela Shiffrin from the United States won the first two slaloms in the season, but then suffered an injury during training in Åre, Sweden in early December, which caused her to miss the two months at the heart of the season; she did not return until mid-February (and won all three slaloms she entered, although it was too late for the season crown).. 

Without Shiffrin competing, Frida Hansdotter of Sweden, who had been runner-up in the discipline the prior two seasons, overtook Shiffrin and jumped into the lead, and even a late push from Slovakian skier Veronika Velez-Zuzulová did not prevent Hansdotter from clinching the championship before the finals.

Standings
 

DNF1 = Did Not Finish run 1
DSQ1 = Disqualified run 1
DNQ = Did not qualify for run 2
DNF2 = Did Not Finish run 2
DSQ2 = Disqualified run 2
DNS = Did Not Start

See also
 2016 Alpine Skiing World Cup – Women's summary rankings
 2016 Alpine Skiing World Cup – Women's Overall
 2016 Alpine Skiing World Cup – Women's Downhill
 2016 Alpine Skiing World Cup – Women's Super-G
 2016 Alpine Skiing World Cup – Women's Giant Slalom
 2016 Alpine Skiing World Cup – Women's Combined

References

External links
 Alpine Skiing at FIS website

Women's Slalom
FIS Alpine Ski World Cup slalom women's discipline titles